Dùn dà Làmh is a Pictish now ruined hill fort near Laggan in the Scottish Highlands. It became a scheduled monument in 1986, with an extension to the protected area realized in 2001.

Overview
The name Dùn dà Làmh is Gaelic and means fort of the two hands.

Dùn dà Làmh sits on a hilltop overlooking a dam on the river Spey to the north, and towards the south it has a view of the River Mashie and Strath Mashie. The hillslopes are steep on three sides, with only the west being more accessible.

The fort has ramparts constructed from slabs. The ramparts at the western section are the ones best preserved. The interior of the fort is mostly free from trees although sproutlings are appearing. Within the fort there are two shelters, which are believed to have been constructed by the Home Guard during the Second World War.

The fort has not been excavated, but was archaeologically surveyed in 2010–2011.

References

Hill forts in Scotland
Pictish sites in Scotland
Archaeological sites in Highland (council area)
Scheduled monuments in Scotland